Sydney Mancasola is an American operatic soprano singer.

Early life and education
Sydney Mancasola is the daughter of McConnell Foundation President and CEO, John Mancasola and his wife Molly. She was born and raised in Redding, California, and began studying violin at the age of 2. She earned an undergraduate degree in vocal performance, under the tutelage of Daune Mahy at Oberlin Conservatory of Music and a graduate degree from the Academy of Vocal Arts in Philadelphia, where she studied with American baritone, William Stone.

Career
Mancasola began her operatic career at Opera Theatre of Saint Louis as a Gerdine Young Artist in 2011 where she later returned to sing Violetta in La traviata in 2018 and Lisette in La rondine, and was later awarded the Mabel Dorn Reeder Foundation Prize in 2016.

Mancasola was named a winner of the 2013 Metropolitan Opera National Council Auditions and returned to the Metropolitan Opera in 2019 to make her house debut as Pamina in The Magic Flute and Frasquita in Carmen. She subsequently went on to sing the title role in Manon and Countess Adèle in Rossini's Le comte Ory with Des Moines Metro Opera, Marie in La fille du régiment with Palm Beach Opera, and Leïla in Les pêcheurs de perles with Florida Grand Opera.

In the fall of 2015 Mancasola made her European debut at Komische Oper Berlin singing Olympia/Antonia/Giulietta in Les contes d'Hoffman, Pamina in Barrie Kosky's production of Die Zauberflöte, and Cleopatra in Giulio Cesare. In 2016 Mancasola joined the ensemble at Oper Frankfurt where she remained for three seasons, singing roles including Roxana in a new production of Król Roger, Gilda in Rigoletto, Pamina in The Magic Flute, Musetta in La bohème, Susanna in Le nozze di Figaro, and the Italian Singer in Capriccio.

Mancasola made her debut at English National Opera in 2017 as Gilda in the Sir Jonathan Miller production of Rigoletto and her debut at Oper Köln as the title role of Manon in 2018.

Mancasola has appeared with several orchestras including San Francisco Symphony, Philadelphia Orchestra, Orchestra Sinfonica Nazionale RAI, Baltimore Symphony Orchestra, Santa Fe Symphony Orchestra, Eugene Symphony, Sun Valley Symphony, and the Lexington Philharmonic Orchestra.

In August 2019, she was awarded a Herald Angel Award for her performance as Bess in Missy Mazzoli and Royce Vavrek's opera Breaking the Waves at the Edinburgh International Festival.

Awards
2013 Metropolitan Opera National Council Audition Winner
2013 Gerda Lissner Foundation Competition Top Prize
2013 Houston Grand Opera Eleanor McCollum Competition, Audience Favorite and Second Prize
2013 Loren L Zachary National Vocal Competition First Prize
2016 Mabel Dorn Reeder Foundation Prize
Judith Raskin Memorial Award for Singers presented by Santa Fe Opera
Margot Bos Standler Scholarship at the Oberlin Conservatory of Music

References

External links

Management
 Sydney Mancasola Operabase
, "Ah! Je veux vivre" from Roméo et Juliette (2016)

20th-century births
Living people
American operatic sopranos
Oberlin Conservatory of Music alumni
Academy of Vocal Arts alumni
Winners of the Metropolitan Opera National Council Auditions
People from Redding, California
Year of birth missing (living people)
Singers from California
Classical musicians from California
21st-century American women opera singers
21st-century American opera singers